SS John Carter Rose was a Liberty ship built in the United States during World War II. She was named after John Carter Rose, a United States circuit judge of the United States Court of Appeals for the Fourth Circuit and previously was a United States District Judge of the United States District Court for the District of Maryland.

Construction
John Carter Rose was laid down on 10 June 1942, under a Maritime Commission (MARCOM) contract, MCE hull 56, by the Bethlehem-Fairfield Shipyard, Baltimore, Maryland; she was sponsored by Mrs. Harry B. Kreisher, the wife of a yard employee, and was launched on 31 July 1942.

History
She was allocated to American West African Line, Inc., on 10 August 1942.

Sinking
John Carter Rose had dispersed from Convoy TRIN-15 on 4 October 1942, during her maiden voyage. She carried  of gasoline, in 26,000 drums, along with food, piping, tires, and trucks.

U-201 fired at John Carter Rose at 00:06 on 7 October, from her stern torpedo tube. U-201 was forced to dive after the torpedo she fired was either a dud, or missed, and John Carter Rose opened up with her stern /50 caliber gun, firing four shots. Turning away and setting her speed to maximum, John Carter Rose unknowingly turned towards U-202, which at 00:29 fired a spread of three torpedoes at her. Hearing two detonation, but not observing any effect on John Carter Rose, at 00:35, U-202 fired her stern torpedo, which missed the zigzagging ship. John Carter Rose again opened up with her 4-inch gun, forcing U-202 to crash dive.

At 13:38, on 7 October, U-201 was able to again make contact with John Carter Rose. At 23:58 U-201 fired a two torpedo spread which again missed. At 02:32, on 8 October, after 32 hours, and seven torpedoes missing her, John Carter Rose was struck between the #2 and #3 holds by U-201. The explosion immediately ignited her cargo of gasoline and blew the hatch covers off. It took 20 minutes to stop the engines so the crew could abandon ship. Eight officers, 28 crewmen, and 17 Armed guards were able to escape in three lifeboats, three Armed guards and five crewmen died. U-201 fired another torpedo at the burning ship at 06:06, and then opened fire with her deck mounted  naval gun at 11:00.

The survivors were questioned by the German crew which gave them cigarettes, bread, first aid, and directions to Venezuela. The U-boat crew also rescued one man from the water and transferred him to one of the lifeboats. On 13 October 1942, after the lifeboats had become separated, the merchant ship  picked up 18 survivors from one lifeboat at 18:00. The Argentinean tanker Santa Cruz picked up the remaining 35 survivors the same day.

References

Bibliography

 
 
 
 
 

 

Liberty ships
Ships sunk by German submarines in World War II
Ships built in Baltimore
1942 ships
World War II shipwrecks in the Caribbean Sea
Maritime incidents in October 1942